Highway 125 (AR 125, Ark. 125, and Hwy. 125) is a north–south state highway in Marion County, Arkansas. The route runs  from Arkansas Highway 235 near Bruno north to the Missouri state line across Bull Shoals Lake on Arkansas' only ferry within the state highway system.

Route description

The route begins at Arkansas Highway 235 near Bruno and runs north past the historic Eros School Building to intersect US 62/US 412 in Pyatt. The routes become concurrent until George's Creek, near the George's Creek Cemetery.

Highway 125 winds north through farms and trees until forming a concurrency with Highway 14 near Lakeway. Highway 14 turns west north of Lakeway, with Highway 125 continuing north through Peel. North of Peel, Highway 125 passes the Highway 125 Use Area on Bull Shoals Lake, which features a boat ramp, public marina, playground, and campground. Highway 125 crosses the Lake on the Peel Ferry, a free ferry and the only ferry in the Arkansas state highway system. Now on the west side of the Lake, Highway 125 runs north to the Missouri state line, where it continues as Missouri Route 125.

Peel Ferry
The Peel Ferry (or Peel's Ferry) is free across Bull Shoals Lake, operating during daylight hours. A ferry has always crossed the water here, prior to the building of Bull Shoals Lake, a wooden craft crossed the White River, giving access to the Missouri side of the water. The boat runs year-round, only halted by dense fog or high wind. Without the ferry, travelers and locals would otherwise need to drive  around the lake to gain access to Missouri.

Two new boats were purchased and dedicated in June 2011.

Major intersections
Mile markers reset at concurrencies.

See also

 List of state highways in Arkansas

References

External links

 
 Arkansas Road Stories - Peel's Ferry

125
Marion
Ferries of Arkansas